Oman Air is the national airline of the Sultanate of Oman. Based at Muscat International Airport in Seeb, Muscat, it operates domestic and international passenger services, as well as regional air taxi and charter flights.

History

Beginnings
Oman Air traces its roots back to 1970 when Oman International Services (OIS) was established. The company became a civil aircraft ground handling provider at Beit Al Falaj Airport. In 1972, OIS moved its operations to the new terminal at Seeb International Airport. The company took over Gulf Air's Light Aircraft Division in 1977, before establishing Aircraft Engineering Division in the same year. Rapidly expanding civil aviation industry of Oman led OIS to the building of several facilities – including hangars, workshops and in-flight catering – to cater for the increase in activity.

In 1981, Oman Aviation Services became a joint-stock company. OAS also purchased 13 aircraft from Gulf Air, allowing the company to replace its turboprops Fokker 27-600 with the −500 series. The following year, Oman Aviation Services jointly commenced jet services, along with Gulf Air, to Salalah. From 1983 to 1993, the company purchased new equipment, including the Cessna Citation, and new facilities to help it improve its services.

Foundation

In 1993, Oman Air was founded. The airline's start was in March, when a wet-leased Boeing 737-300 from Ansett Worldwide Aviation Services (AWAS) flew from Muscat to Salalah. In July of the same year, the airline's first international flight was operated to Dubai, also using a Boeing 737-300. Flights to other destinations quickly followed, with Trivandrum (Thiruvananthapuram) services starting in November, Kuwait and Karachi in January 1994, and Colombo in October. In 1995, two Airbus A320s were wet-leased from Region Air of Singapore to replace the 737s. From 1995 to 1997, services were commenced to Mumbai, Dhaka, Abu Dhabi, Doha and Chennai. In October 1998, Oman Air was admitted in the international aviation industry trade group International Air Transport Association (IATA). By the end of the following year, Gwadar, Peshawar, Jeddah and Al Ain were included in the airline's ever-expanding route network, although the former two, along with a host of other destinations, were withdrawn in 2000.

Recapitalization
In March 2007, the Omani government recapitalised the airline, which saw the government increasing its shareholding from approximately 33 to 80 percent. It was also announced that Oman Air would be re-evaluating its strategic plans, with a possibility of entering the long-haul market. This culminated in May 2007 when the Sultanate of Oman withdrew from Gulf Air to focus on the development of Oman Air, making Gulf Air a solely Bahraini airline. Oman Air commenced its long-haul services on 26 November 2007 by launching flights to Bangkok and London.

On 2 April 2007, Oman Air announced it had placed a firm order with Airbus for 5 Airbus A330 aircraft for delivery in 2009. At the 2009 Dubai Air Show, Oman Air finalized the order, which involved 3 A330-300s and 2 A330-200s. Deliveries started during the third quarter of 2009. In February 2009, Oman Air announced intentions to lease another 2 A330-200s from Jet Airways. During the 2009 Dubai Air Show, Oman Air Air also finalised an order for five Embraer 175 aircraft with another 5 options, which the airline received from 2011.
 
In March 2010, Oman Air became the first airline in the world to offer both mobile phone and Wi-Fi Internet services on selected routes.

Development since 2010
By November 2010, the Omani government held a 99.8 percent stake in the airline. In 2010 Maitha Al Mahrouqi was appointed Country Manager. In 2011, Oman Air won the Gold award for the "Airline of the Year" at France's Laurier d'Or du Voyage d'Affaires.

During September 2013 the CEO was quoted as saying that Oman Air was studying to move to a 50 aircraft strong fleet by 2017. In April 2015, Oman Air announced it would phase out its smaller aircraft to focus on an all Airbus and Boeing fleet. The 2 ATR 42-500 aircraft were withdrawn by the end of 2015 while the 4 Embraer 175 and the Boeing 737-700 aircraft will be retired by the end of 2016. In April 2017 Oman Air announced plans to replace the A330s with Airbus A350s or Boeing 787s. In July 2017, Oman Air received the award for "Best Airline Staff Service in the Middle East" at the Skytrax World Airline Awards. Besides, in September that year, the Seven Stars Luxury Lifestyle and Hospitality Awards named it the "Best Airline in Europe, the Middle East, and Africa" for the second year in a row. In October 2018, the CEO of Oman Air Abdulaziz bin Saud al Raisi announced that the airlines aim to add over 60 new destinations and 70 aircraft by 2022.

In June 2019, the International Air Transport Association (IATA) granted the level 4 New Distribution Capability (NDC) certification to the national airline of the Sultanate of Oman. The carrier became one of the first airlines to function on the latest standards, adding the title to its existing level 3 NDC certification. Oman Air, along with Kenya Airways announced the expansion of its codeshare cooperation, which was first signed in August 2017. The expansion, effective since 1 October 2019, increased the destinations for their flyers, where they were allowed to seamlessly travel beyond Nairobi to Entebbe in Uganda and Johannesburg in South Africa.

In February 2021, Oman Air announced it would abandon fleet expansion plans due to lower demand as COVID-19 spreads. Chairman Mohammed Al-Barwani announced the reduction of fleet from the current 50 planes to 36 aircraft. Additionally, a few non-profitable routes, including Athens and Casablanca, are being terminated.

In September 2021, Oman Air announced its intentions to enter Oneworld alliance by the end of 2022. This was followed by an announcement in June 2022 that it will join the alliance in 2024.

Corporate affairs

In-flight services
In compliance with Islamic dietary laws, all meals served onboard Oman Air are prepared according to Halal guidelines. Special meals are available by request.

Oman Air is also one of only five airlines in the GCC to serve alcoholic beverages (the others being Gulf Air, Emirates, Qatar Airways and Etihad Airways). Alcoholic beverages are only available on long-haul international flights and in compliance with GCC and Islamic laws, alcohol is not served inflight during the Ramadan season or on inter-Middle East flights. The alcohol ban is also applied on Saudi Arabia and Iran routes, in which alcohol is prohibited in both countries by Islamic law.

Airbus A330-300 and Boeing 787 aircraft are equipped with Wi-Fi and mobile network portability on board. The inflight magazine of Oman Air is called Wings of Oman and is available to all classes of travel on both domestic and international flights in both English and Arabic.

Frequent flyer program
Sindbad is Oman Air's frequent flyer program, launched in 2006. It is a three-tier frequent flyer program managed directly by Oman Air. The three tiers are Sindbad Blue, Sindbad Silver which requires 20,000 Tier miles or flown 15 segments on Oman Air in a 12 months period to qualify as well as maintain the Sindbad Silver Tier level, Sindbad Gold which requires 40,000 Tier miles or 30 Tier segments in a 12 months period to qualify and maintain the Sinbad Gold Tier. Sindbad has a partnership agreement with the respective program of Etihad Airways and miles can be earned through several Sindbad partners.

Sponsorships
 Oman Air became the Presenting Sponsor for the 2015 NBO Golf Classic Grand Final.
 Orphaned Palestinian children have visited Al Khoudh child welfare centre. This visit has been sponsored by Oman Air and Dar Al Atta’a.

Livery
The original livery features a white fuselage and a red vertical stabilizer with the former Oman Air logo. A green stripe is painted on the rear fuselage, and the Oman Air Arabic and English logos are painted on top of the windows using the corporate red-green palette. The wingtip is painted red. The current livery also features a white fuselage, but the vertical stabilizer changed to blue, with the new logo painted in gold.

Destinations

As of July 2020, Oman Air operates a network of 50 destinations in 27 countries out of its primary hub at Muscat. The country that sees the most services is India with 11 destinations.

Codeshare agreements
Oman Air has codeshare agreements with the following airlines:

 Egyptair
 Emirates
 Ethiopian Airlines
 Etihad Airways
 Garuda Indonesia
 Gulf Air
 Kenya Airways
 KLM
 Lufthansa
 Malaysia Airlines
 Qatar Airways
 Royal Jordanian
 Saudia
 Singapore Airlines
 SriLankan Airlines
 Thai Airways International
 Turkish Airlines

Fleet

Current fleet
, Oman Air operates the following aircraft:

Historic fleet
Oman Air operated the following aircraft previously:

References

External links

 Official website

Airlines of Oman
Airlines established in 1981
1981 establishments in Oman
Arab Air Carriers Organization members
Companies based in Muscat, Oman
Government-owned airlines
Omani brands